The White Mosque is a historic mosque in the eastern Bosnian town of Srebrenica. It is also known as Hajji Skenderbeg's Mosque.

History 

Initially on the site was the Catholic Church of Saint Nicholas, built in 1394 by merchants from Dubrovnik (Ragusa) and dedicated to this patron saint of travelers. After the conquest of the area by the Ottoman Empire in the 15th century the Catholics started leaving the area. The mosque was built in the 17th century on the ruins of the church after the departure of the last Franciscans from Srebrenica. The style was in Ottoman architecture.

In 1935, the mosque underwent extensive restoration and extension work for another hall. Also, its appearance changed significantly at that time, and the minaret was in the middle of the building.

The army and police of Republika Srpska demolished the mosque to its foundations in 1995 during the Bosnian War. It was rebuilt with a donation from the government of Malaysia and reopened on September 28, 2002. Repair work on the roof and further renovation work through private donations was done in 2020. 

In the courtyard of the mosque there is also a centuries-old Muslim cemetery (šehitluk).

References

Further reading 
 Encyclopedia of Yugoslavia. JLZ Zagreb 1980. Volume I

External links 

 Medžlis IZ Srebrenica 

Mosques in Bosnia and Herzegovina
Srebrenica